Kadamtali is a Thana of Dhaka District in the Division of Dhaka, Bangladesh. Its area is 10.16 km2.

Education

There are four colleges in the upazila. They include A. K. High School and College, Mohammadbug Adorsho College,  and Shyampur Model School and College, founded in 2006.

See also
Upazilas of Bangladesh
Districts of Bangladesh
Divisions of Bangladesh

References

Thanas of Dhaka